Wallkill is a town in Orange County, New York, United States. The population was 30,486 at the 2020 census.  It is centrally located in the county. Interstate 84 crosses New York State Route 17 in the southern part of the town. U.S. Route 6 and  New York State routes 17K, 211 and 302 also cross portions of the town.

History
The original land patent for the town was dated 1724, but little was done for decades to develop and settle the region. The town was established in 1772, but part of the town was lost upon the formation of Ulster County.  Wallkill's claim to fame during the American Revolution was the production of gunpowder in factories in Phillipsburgh and Craigville for American troops by Henry Wisner and his son-in-law Moses Phillips.

Geography

The town almost completely surrounds the city of Middletown.

Demographics

As of the 2010 census, the population of the town was 27,426.  The ethnic makeup of the population was 57.8% white (non-Hispanic), 22.5% Hispanic, 16.0% African-American, 3.2% Asian, and 0.5% Native American.

As of the census of 2000, there were 24,659 people, 8,866 households, and 6,330 families residing in the town. The population density was 396.6 people per square mile (153.1/km2). There were 9,283 housing units at an average density of 149.3 per square mile (57.7/km2). The racial makeup of the town was 80.70% white, 9.34% African American, 0.30% Native American, 2.39% Asian, 0.05% Pacific Islander, 4.31% from other races, and 2.90% from two or more races. Hispanic or Latino of any race were 13.40% of the population.

36.5% of the households had children under the age of 18 living with them; 54.6% were married couples living together, 12.4% had a female householder with no husband present, and 28.6% were non-families. 22.6% of all households were made up of individuals, and 7.9% had someone living alone who was 65 years of age or older. The average household size was 2.72 and the average family size was 3.22.

In the town, the population was spread out, with 26.2% under the age of 18, 7.6% from 18 to 24, 30.9% from 25 to 44, 24.4% from 45 to 64, and 10.8% who were 65 years of age or older. The median age was 36 years. For every 100 females, there were 94.1 males. For every 100 females age 18 and over, there were 90.2 males.

The median income for a household in the town was $51,625, and the median income for a family was $57,088. Males had a median income of $40,145 versus $29,788 for females. The per capita income for the town was $21,654. About 7.7% of families and 8.4% of the population were below the poverty line, including 11.6% of those under age 18 and 9.1% of those age 65 or over.

Government

The supervisor of the town is George Serrano (R), the four councilman are Mark Coyne (R), Eric Valentin (D), Neil Meyer (D), and Eric Johnson (R).

Police department
Thel police department is a full-time police force led by Chief Robert Hertman.

From 2001 to 2006 the department was subject to oversight by a federal court-appointed monitor, the result of a consent decree in a suit brought against the town through the New York Attorney General's office. The suit was prompted by multiple complaints of harassment of young women and other abuses of police authority.

The department consists of one lieutenant, seven sergeants, four detectives, 54 patrol officers, 23 dispatchers, nine parking enforcement officers, one animal control officer, and 10 court bailiffs. .

Fire departments
Wallkill is divided into seven fire districts: Circleville, Howells, Mechanicstown, Silver Lake, Pocatello, Washington Heights, and Bloomingburg.

Economy
The town was the site of the first Lloyd's Supercenter. It is home to many retail stores, shopping centers and restaurants, many of which are located along Route 211, in a suburban pattern related to highway development. Both the Galleria at Crystal Run and a Super Wal-Mart are located in the town. The latter replaced Orange Plaza, the first mall constructed in the area.

The town of Wallkill is home to the Orange County Fair each summer.

Recreation and leisure

Town of Wallkill Golf Club
Town taxpayers own an 18-hole golf club which was designed by landscape architect Steve Esposito.

Woodstock Festival
Woodstock Ventures, a group established to produce the Woodstock Festival in 1969, initially leased a tract of land in an industrial park in Wallkill. Town officials, deeply concerned about the size of crowds expected for the event and the logistics involved in hosting it, disallowed the festival the site through the Zoning Board of Appeals. Ultimately the Woodstock festival was held instead in Bethel, 40 miles northwest of Wallkill.

Communities and locations in the town of Wallkill

 Baileyville – a hamlet near Howells, located on NY-211 near the western town line
 Crystal Run – a hamlet south of Michigan Corners, near Interstate 84 at County Road 83
 Circleville – a hamlet in the northern part of town on NY-302
 East Middletown – a village in the southeastern part of town
 Fair Oaks – a hamlet in the northern part of town on NY-17
 Highland Lake – a small lake near the western town line
 Highland Lakes State Park – an undeveloped state park in the northern part of the town
 Howells – a hamlet in the northwestern part of town, north of Baileyville
 Maple Glen – a hamlet near the western town line
 Mechanicstown – a hamlet and census-designated place in the southeastern part of town
 Michigan Corners – a hamlet near Scotchtown in the eastern part of town on NY-211
 Middletown, a city almost entirely surrounded by the town of Wallkill
 Milburn – a hamlet by Highland Lakes State Park
 Phillipsburg – a hamlet in the southeastern part of the town, on the Wallkill River and NY-17
 Pilgrim Corners – a hamlet bordering the western side of Middletown on NY-211
 Rockville – a hamlet in the northern part of town
 Scotchtown – a hamlet and census-designated place in the eastern part of town on Route 101
 Silver Lake – a small lake east of Middletown
 Stony Ford – a location near the eastern town line at the Wallkill River on County Road 53
 Van Burenville – a hamlet in the northwestern part of town near Mount Hope
 Washington Heights – a hamlet and census-designated place in the northwestern part of town

References

External links

  Town of Wallkill

Towns in Orange County, New York
Populated places established in 1772
Wallkill River
Poughkeepsie–Newburgh–Middletown metropolitan area
Towns in the New York metropolitan area